Josef Kořenář (born 31 January 1998) is a Czech ice hockey goaltender for HC Sparta Praha of the Czech Extraliga (ELH). An undrafted player, Kořenář previously played for the San Jose Sharks and the Arizona Coyotes in the National Hockey League (NHL).

Playing career
In July 2017, it was announced that Kořenář had signed an entry-level contract with the San Jose Sharks as an undrafted free agent after spending the 2016–17 season with the Lincoln Stars of the USHL. Kořenář spent the next season on loan to the Dukla Jihlava organization of the Czech Extraliga.

On 26 August 2020, Kořenář was assigned by the San Jose Sharks to HC Oceláři Třinec of the Czech Extraliga, on loan until the commencement of the delayed 2020–21 North American season.

After being in net for the San Jose Barracuda and in the taxi squad for the 2020–21 season, he made his NHL debut on 10 April 2021, in a 2–4 loss to the Los Angeles Kings, playing the final period. He was handed his first start four days later, in a 1–4 loss to the Anaheim Ducks. His first win came on 26 April 2021, in a 6–4 win over the Arizona Coyotes. After the 2020–21 season, he signed a one-year contract extension.

On 17 July 2021, Kořenář was traded by the Sharks along with a second-round draft pick to the Arizona Coyotes for Adin Hill and a seventh-round draft pick.

As an impending restricted free agent with the Coyotes following the  season, Kořenář opted to return to his homeland in agreeing to a two-year contract with HC Sparta Praha of the ELH, on 7 June 2022.

Career statistics

Regular season and playoffs

International

Awards and honors

References

External links

1998 births
Living people
Arizona Coyotes players
Czech expatriate ice hockey people
Czech expatriate ice hockey players in the United States
Czech ice hockey goaltenders
HC Benátky nad Jizerou players
HC Dukla Jihlava players
HC Oceláři Třinec players
Lincoln Stars players
People from Pelhřimov District
Rapid City Rush players
San Jose Barracuda players
San Jose Sharks players
Tucson Roadrunners players
Undrafted National Hockey League players
Sportspeople from the Vysočina Region